Liu Jianwei (born October 1963), also known by his pen name Liu Shengyuan, is a Chinese novelist. He is best known for his novel Heroic Time which won the Mao Dun Literature Prize (2005), one of the most prestigious literature prizes in China.

Biography
Liu was born in Zhenping County, Henan Province in 1963.

After the Cultural Revolution, Liu joined the People's Liberation Army, he graduated from People's Liberation Army College of Information Technology in 1983. After graduation, Liu worked in August First Film Studio.

Liu started to publish novels in 1985.

In 1991, Liu was accepted to  People's Liberation Army College of Art and graduated in 1993. Then he entered Lu Xun Literature Academy. Liu was educated in Beijing Normal University from 1994 to 1997. After graduation, Liu worked in Chengdu Military Region.

In 2004, Liu was transferred to August First Film Studio.

Works

Novels
 The Great Wall
 Breakthrough
 Heroic Time
 SARS Crisis
 The Rock
 The Terrifying Waves
 Love in the Anti-Japanese War

Reportages
 The Red Sun and the White Sun
 The Sun Comes Up in the East
 The World Is Not Enough

Awards
 Heroic Time – 6th Mao Dun Literature Prize (2005)

References

1963 births
People from Zhenping County, Henan
Beijing Normal University alumni
People's Liberation Army Arts College alumni
Writers from Nanyang, Henan
Living people
Mao Dun Literature Prize laureates
Chinese male novelists